The atoll fruit dove (Ptilinopus coralensis) is a species of bird in the family Columbidae. It is endemic to the Tuamotu archipelago in French Polynesia. Its natural habitats are subtropical or tropical moist lowland forests and plantations. It is threatened by habitat loss.

Distribution and population 
The atoll fruit dove is widespread throughout the islands of the Tuamotu Archipelago, French Polynesia. In a 1999 survey it was found to be uncommon on five out of eight islands visited, but others have found it to be abundant on some atolls which have remained free from the ravages of introduced predators.

Ecology 
The atoll fruit dove is the world's only dove in the tropical Pacific that has adapted exclusively to low coral atolls. It lives in forests and abandoned coconut plantations. It mainly feeds on insects and seeds, usually on the ground. This species also eats the leaves of the "tafano" or "kahaia" (Guettarda speciosa ) trees with odorous flowers.

Threats 
The atoll fruit dove is threatened by predation by rats that have established colonies on a small number of islands were this lives. The species is also vulnerable to habitat destruction due to deforestation and the destruction of old, abandoned coconut plantations. The species is rather tame and is rare in inhabited areas making hunting a possible threat.

References

atoll fruit dove
Birds of the Tuamotus
Endemic birds of French Polynesia
Near threatened animals
Near threatened biota of Oceania
atoll fruit dove
Taxonomy articles created by Polbot
Taxa named by Titian Peale